Maciej Szpunar (born 1971) is a Polish lawyer, attorney at law, habilitated doctor of legal sciences, university professor at the University of Silesia, in 2008–2009 undersecretary of state in the Office of the Committee for European Integration, in 2010–2013 undersecretary state in the Ministry of Foreign Affairs, from 2013 advocate general in the European Court of Justice.

In 2013, he was awarded the Officer's Cross of the Order of Polonia Restituta.

See also
List of members of the European Court of Justice

References

1971 births
Living people
Advocates General of the European Court of Justice
Polish officials of the European Union